Dermatobranchus gonatophorus is a species of sea slug, a nudibranch, a marine gastropod mollusc in the family Arminidae.

Distribution
This species occurs in the Indo-Pacific region. It has been reported from South Africa, Thailand, Malaysia and Indonesia.

References

Arminidae
Gastropods described in 1824